Ziggy Stardust: The Motion Picture is a live album by English musician David Bowie, released in October 1983 in conjunction with the film of the same name. Prior to that it had existed in bootleg form, notably His Masters Voice – Bowie and the Spiders From Mars' Last Stand.

The album documents the final show which Bowie performed in his Ziggy Stardust persona. Just before the final track, he announces, "Of all the shows on this tour, this particular show will remain with us the longest, because not only is it the last show of the tour, but it's the last show that we'll ever do. Thank you." Many in the audience believed that Bowie himself was retiring.

Production and release
D. A. Pennebaker filmed the concert and RCA recorded it with the intention of releasing a live album. However the project was shelved for several reasons, rumoured to include Bowie's desire to leave Ziggy behind, and the poor quality of the recordings. Reasoning that RCA would most likely issue the material sooner or later regardless, Bowie and producer Tony Visconti mixed the recordings in 1981. This mix has been heavily criticised, although Visconti describes it as "more of a salvage job than an artistic endeavor" considering the state of the source material.

The album was eventually released in October 1983 as a double LP soundtrack to Pennebaker's documentary. Partly due to the limitations of the LP record format, the release omitted, shortened or reordered several items from the original tapes. "White Light/White Heat" was issued as a single in November.

Rereleases
In April 2003, the 30th Anniversary 2CD Set was released by EMI/Virgin with copy control. Remixed by Visconti, it was considered a significant improvement on the original. It contains additional material, including introductions, spoken passages and the complete version of "The Width of a Circle"; "Changes" was also slotted into its correct position in the original concert's running order, following "Moonage Daydream". "The Jean Genie/Love Me Do" and "Round and Round" encore with Jeff Beck are still omitted. The continued absence of Beck's sequence has been variously attributed to an issue over royalties or to the guitarist feeling, in Tony Visconti's words, that "he didn't fit in the film".

Track listing
All songs written by David Bowie, except where noted.

Original release (1983) 
Disc one
 "Hang On to Yourself" – 2:55
 "Ziggy Stardust" – 3:09
 "Watch That Man" – 4:10
 "Wild Eyed Boy from Freecloud"/"All the Young Dudes"/"Oh! You Pretty Things" – 6:37
 "Moonage Daydream" – 6:17
 "Space Oddity" – 4:49
 "My Death" (Jacques Brel, Mort Shuman) – 5:45

Disc two
"Cracked Actor" – 2:52
"Time" – 5:12
"Width of a Circle" – 9:35
"Changes" – 3:35
"Let's Spend the Night Together" (Mick Jagger, Keith Richards) – 3:09
"Suffragette City" – 3:02
"White Light/White Heat" (Lou Reed) – 4:06
"Rock 'n' Roll Suicide" – 4:20

20th Anniversary edition (2003)

Disc one
"Intro" (incorporating Beethoven's Ninth Symphony, arranged and performed by Wendy Carlos) (Ludwig van Beethoven) – 1:05
"Hang on to Yourself" – 2:55
"Ziggy Stardust" – 3:19
"Watch That Man" – 4:14
"Wild Eyed Boy From Freecloud" – 3:15
"All the Young Dudes" – 1:38
"Oh! You Pretty Things" – 1:46
"Moonage Daydream" – 6:25
"Changes" – 3:36
"Space Oddity" – 5:05
"My Death" (Brel, Shuman) – 7:20

Disc two
"Intro" (incorporating William Tell Overture (Abridged), arranged and performed by Wendy Carlos) (Gioacchino Rossini) – 1:01
"Cracked Actor" – 3:03
"Time" – 5:31
"The Width of a Circle" – 15:45
"Let's Spend the Night Together" (Jagger, Richards) – 3:02
"Suffragette City" – 4:32
"White Light/White Heat" (Reed) – 4:01
"Farewell Speech" – 0:39
"Rock 'n' Roll Suicide" – 5:17

Personnel
David Bowie – guitar, vocals, saxophone, harmonica
Mick Ronson – lead guitar, vocals
Trevor Bolder – bass
Mick Woodmansey – drums
Mike Garson – piano, Mellotron, organ
Ken Fordham – alto, tenor, baritone saxophone
John Hutchinson – rhythm guitar, backing vocals
Brian Wilshaw – tenor saxophone, flute
Geoffrey MacCormack – backing vocals, percussion

Production
David Bowie, Mike Moran – live recording production and mixing
Ken Scott – recording engineer
David Bowie, Tony Visconti, Bruce Tergeson – 2003 remixing

Charts

Weekly charts

References

Albums produced by David Bowie
David Bowie live albums
David Bowie soundtracks
1983 live albums
EMI Records soundtracks
Rykodisc soundtracks
Virgin Records soundtracks
RCA Records soundtracks